Estadio Manuel "Ciclón" Echeverría is a stadium in Navojoa, Sonora, named after one local baseball player, Manuel Echeverría, nicknamed "Ciclón".  He is a member of the Mexican Baseball Hall of Fame.

It is the home field of the baseball team Mayos de Navojoa of the Mexican Pacific League. It opened on 7 October 1970
and holds 11,500 people, all seated. It is located within the Unidad Deportiva Faustino Félix Serna.

Dimensions
Left Field - 328 ft (100 m)  Center Field - 400 ft (122 m)  Right Field - 328 ft (100 m)

References

External links 
 Satellite view on Google Maps

Manuel "Ciclon" Echeverria
Sports venues completed in 1970
Sports venues in Sonora